Devil's Lair is an Australian winery based at Forest Grove, in the Margaret River wine region of Western Australia.  It is named after the Devil's Lair cave, which is just across the Bussell Highway from the winery's vineyard.

Established in 1985, the winery was acquired in December 1996 by Southcorp, which was later taken over by Foster's Group.  In May 2011, Foster's Group's wine business, including Devil's Lair, was spun off into a separate company, Treasury Wine Estates.

The Devil's Lair winery also makes the wines marketed under the brand name "Fifth Leg".

See also

 Australian wine
 List of wineries in Western Australia
 Western Australian wine

References

Notes

Bibliography

External links
 – official site

Food and drink companies established in 1985
Margaret River, Western Australia
Wineries in Western Australia
Australian companies established in 1985
Treasury Wine Estates
1985 establishments in Australia